Kalinda Sharma (born c.1984) is a character on the CBS television series The Good Wife, portrayed by Archie Panjabi for the first six seasons of the show's run. For her performance, Panjabi received three Primetime Emmy Award nominations, winning in 2010, and received one Golden Globe nomination.

Background
Little is known of Kalinda's background. She worked for State's Attorney Peter Florrick (Chris Noth) for three years prior to the beginning of the show and he fired her after accusing her of working two jobs. She's first introduced as an investigator working at Stern, Lockhart & Gardner, and she becomes fast friends with Alicia Florrick.

Eventually however, Peter's wife Alicia finds out Kalinda had had a one-night stand with Peter before she met her, damaging their friendship, but the two eventually reconcile. In season four, it is also revealed that Kalinda has an estranged abusive husband, Nick Saverese (played by Marc Warren). Kalinda also grows romantically close with Cary Agos (Matt Czuchry). In season six, she desperately tries to save Cary from malicious prosecution on drug related charges while Alicia is busy running for office, and at a point of desperation, she fakes a Brady violation in order to have Cary's charges dropped. Later when she's found out, she's forced to surrender drug dealer Lemond Bishop (Mike Colter) to the state's attorney's office in order to prevent Diane Lockhart (Christine Baranski) from being prosecuted. In fear for her safety after turning state's evidence on Lemond Bishop, Kalinda disappears.

Personality
Kalinda is unflappable, inscrutable, fiercely private, and occasionally physically violent. She is exceptionally good at her job, although her tactics are not always strictly legal. She is often the key to the firm's winning a case, usually at the 11th hour. She usually does not work well with others. Although Kalinda doesn't let many people close to her, she becomes good friends with Alicia, with the aid of tequila shots; and she feels protective of Alicia. Kalinda has a cynical, misanthropic outlook on human behavior. She is bisexual and has a series of relationships through the show, mostly with women and often because they can help her with a case. Kalinda once claimed that she prefers women because as far as she's concerned, women are better lovers than men because women understand her needs and feelings better. Very little is known about Kalinda when the series begins, and she is incredibly secretive about her past.

Style
Kalinda's fashion plays a huge role in her character. As an employee in a prestigious law firm her outfit is a contrast to those of the lawyers as it is a lot more provocative and edgy. The character's signature wardrobe piece has become a pair of knee-high boots; the character initially wore pumps but Panjabi felt that boots "grounded her in the character." The character is also noted for wearing a lot of leather jackets often seen in Burberry, Elie Tahari, Dolce & Gabbana and Prada. The character according to the costume designer has over 60 leather jackets.

References

Television characters introduced in 2009
Fictional characters from Chicago
Fictional bisexual females
The Good Wife characters
Fictional Indian-American people